NH 103 may refer to:

 National Highway 103 (India)
 New Hampshire Route 103, United States